Cargo of the Brig Aurora v. United States, 11 U.S. (7 Cranch) 382 (1813), involved a forfeiture statute that Congress passed with a condition.  The 1809 trade prohibition against Great Britain was to be reinstated in 1810 unless the President declared, by proclamation, that Great Britain was no longer violating the neutrality of the United States.  The defendant argued unsuccessfully that such a conditional law unconstitutionally delegated congressional legislative authority to the President.  The Court unequivocally upheld "reviving the act...either expressly or conditionally, as their judgment should direct."

References

External links
 

United States Supreme Court cases
United States Supreme Court cases of the Marshall Court
1813 in United States case law
United States nondelegation doctrine case law